Hyroeades (Old Iranian: Vīrayauda, Ancient Greek: Ὑροιάδης) was the first Persian soldier to scale the walls of Sardis during Cyrus the Great's invasion of Lydia in 546 BC. He was of the Amard tribe.

References

Herodotus. The Histories. University of Chicago. Print.

Lee, John W.I. "Cyrus and Cambyses—Founders of the Empire." Lecture.

Hyroeades. Perseus Encyclopedia. Tufts University. Web. 1 Apr. 2012.

External links 
 The Persian Empire
 Perseus Encyclopedia

Military personnel of the Achaemenid Empire
6th-century BC Iranian people